Kenneth Uwadi (born 29 April 1979) is a Nigerian writer, advocate of good governance, social media personality, blogger and entrepreneur.

Biography
Uwadi is from Mmahu-Egbema of Ohaji/Egbema Local Government Area of Imo State, Nigeria. He was educated at University of Port Harcourt where he received a degree in Linguistics and communication studies. He worked for Alcon Nigeria Limited Port Harcourt first as accounts officer from 2003-2004 and later as accountant from 2005-2021. While working at Alcon Nigeria Limited, he joined the group Youths Against Human Rights Violation And Corrupt Practices in 2007 and became its Coordinator in 2011.

Activism
He served as Coordinator of the group Youths Against Human Rights Violation And Corrupt Practices from 2011-2014. He went on to found Youths for Human Rights Protection and Transparency Initiative (YARPTI), a youths right and development non-governmental organization in April 2015. His articles have appeared on several online and print news mediums in Nigeria.

He is one of the popular voices in Nigeria that drives social change through social media and is also an outspoken critic of several governors of Imo State and some Nigerian Presidents. Uwadi spearheaded vicious newspaper chronicles of Governor Rochas Okorocha's "sins" and attacks on the governor from 2011 to 2019. He also criticized the government of Emeka Ihedioha in Imo State. He has played active roles in campaign for good governance and youth employment in Nigeria, including the struggle against human rights violations and neglect of the oil producing areas of Imo State. When an Owerri-based social crusader, Citizen Ikenna Samuelson Iwuoha and his wife were falsely accused of murder and arrested on 3 June 2014, he was involved in the struggle for their release.

Social media presence
Kenneth Uwadi is popular on social media. He has accounts on various social media sites, including Twitter, Facebook and Instagram.'

Personal life
He is married with two children.

See also
Youths For Human Rights Protection And Transparency Initiative
Citizen Ikenna Samuelson Iwuoha
List of Nigerian bloggers

References
http://www.newsexpressngr.com/news/23373-Popular-Imo-socio-political-crusader-resigns-appointment-accuses-oil-services-firm-of-ethnic-bias
http://www.247nigerianewsupdate.co/2016/01/yarpti-frowns-at-disrespect-of-court.html
http://www.newsexpressngr.com/news/detail.php?news=14977&title=Group-demands-immediate-release-of-incarcerated-blogger-Chris-Kehinde-Nwandu-aka-CKN
http://www.dailytrust.com.ng/news/letters/free-emeka-ugwuonye-now/154018.html
http://www.dailytrust.com.ng/news/letters/rochas-pay-us-our-salaries/108350.html
http://www.dailytrust.com.ng/news/letters/an-open-letter-to-nlc-in-imo-state/7290.html
http://www.newsbearerweeklymagazine.com/portal/content.asp?ContentId=1000
http://innocentonyeukwu.blogspot.com.ng/2014/04/imo-speaker-fraud-scandal-samuelson.html
http://www.elombah.com/index.php/opinion/8547-sam-onwuemeodo-s-garment-of-many-troubles-part-one
http://theicon.ng/2015/05/18/imo-speakers-aide-threatens-activist-over-corruption-petition/
http://www.thenigerianvoice.com/news/176338/1/free-samuelson-iwuoha-now.html
http://www.dailytrust.com.ng/sunday/index.php/news/20819-huriwa-clears-imo-speaker-of-corruption-ritual-killings-allegations
http://www.newsexpressngr.com/news/detail.php?news=11447&title=Corruption-Dont-make-Uwajumogu-a-Minister-Group-tells-Buhari-Im-innocent-Imo-Speaker
http://www.imotrumpeta.com/?p=11192
http://newswirengr.com/2014/04/12/group-demands-the-immediate-release-of-activist-umar-goodman-unlawfully-arrested-by-gov-idris-wada/
http://newsofthesouth.com/anti-corruption-group-hits-streets-over-fraud-in-imo-speakers-office/
http://africanheraldexpress.com/blog8/2014/06/12/human-rights-violation-in-imo-state/
http://allafrica.com/stories/201502090375.html
https://www.newsghana.com.gh/continues-illegal-detention-by-police-of-samuelson-iwuoha/
https://www.thenigerianvoice.com/news/216920/popular-socio-political-crusader-comrade-kenneth-uwadi-res.html
http://famousnaijaz.com/about-us/
https://www.thenigerianvoice.com/sports/179378/imo-speakers-aide-threatens-activistblogger.html

External links
http://yarpti.org/
http://famousnaijaz.com/

Social media influencers
Nigerian Internet celebrities
Nigerian media personalities
Nigerian human rights activists
1979 births
Living people
Nigerian activists
People from Imo State
Children's rights activists
Sexual abuse victim advocates
Nigerian bloggers
University of Port Harcourt alumni
Igbo activists
21st-century Nigerian writers
21st-century Nigerian businesspeople
Nigerian editors
Nigerian magazine founders